Angus McIntosh may refer to:

 Angus McIntosh (footballer) (1884–1945), British footballer
 Angus McIntosh (linguist) (1914–2005), British linguist and academic